Dakar Department is one of the Departments of Senegal, located in the Dakar Region.

The department of Dakar is one of the four departments of the Dakar region, which is one of the 14 regions of Senegal. The Dakar region encompasses the city of Dakar and all its suburbs along the Cape Verde Peninsula. Its territory is thus roughly the same as the territory of the metropolitan area of Dakar. Since the administrative reforms of 1996, the regions of Senegal, which until then were merely local administrative structures of the central state, have been turned into full-fledged political units, with democratically elected regional councils, and regional presidents. They were given extensive powers, and manage economic development, transportation, or environmental protection issues at the regional level, thus coordinating the actions of the communes below them.

The department of Dakar is divided into four arrondissements: Almadies, Grand Dakar, Parcelles Assainies (which literally means "drained lots"; this is the most populous arrondissement of Dakar), and Plateau/Gorée (downtown Dakar). These arrondissements are quite different from the arrondissements of Paris, being merely local administrative structures of the central state, like the Senegalese departments, and are thus more comparable to French departmental arrondissements.

In 1996, a massive reform of the administrative and political divisions of Senegal was voted by the Parliament of Senegal. The commune of Dakar, whose population approached 1 million inhabitants, was deemed too large and too populated to be properly managed by a central municipality, and so on August 30, 1996 Dakar was divided into 19 communes d'arrondissement.

These communes d'arrondissement were given extensive powers, and are very much like regular communes. They have more powers than the arrondissements of Paris, and are more akin to the London boroughs. The commune of Dakar was maintained above these 19 communes d'arrondissement, and it coordinates the activities of the communes d'arrondissement, much as Greater London coordinates the activities of the London boroughs.

The 19 communes d'arrondissement belong to either of the four arrondissements of Dakar, and the sous-préfet of each arrondissement is in charge of controlling the activities of the communes d'arrondissement in his arrondissement.

Dakar Department includes the commune d'arrondissement of Dakar-Plateau (34,626 inhabitants), in the arrondissement of Plateau/Gorée, is the historical heart of the city, and most ministries and public administrations are located there. The densest and most populous commune d'arrondissement is Médina (136,697 inhabitants), in the arrondissement of Plateau/Gorée. The smallest one is the commune d'arrondissement of Île de Gorée (1,034 inhabitants), in the arrondissement of
Plateau/Gorée.

Table of Administrative Sub-divisions

References
  dakarville.sn - City of Dakar official website.
 
  Découpage administratif de la région de Dakar: Collectivités locales de la région de Dakar.
 Geohive - Statistical data

Departments of Senegal
Dakar Region